Stephanie Paulsell is an American theologian, currently the Susan Shallcross Swartz Professor of the Practice of Christian Studies at Harvard Divinity School.

Works
 Lamentations and the Song of Songs: A Theological Commentary on the Bible (Westminster John Knox Press, 2012) 
 Honoring the Body: Meditations on a Christian Practice (Jossey-Bass, 2003) 
 The Scope of Our Art: The Vocation of the Theological Teacher (Wm. B. Eerdmans, 2001)

References

Year of birth missing (living people)
Living people
Harvard Divinity School faculty
21st-century American theologians
Greensboro College alumni
University of Chicago alumni
Women Christian theologians